Artem Serhiyovych Udachyn (born March 26, 1980) is a male weightlifter from Ukraine. He twice competed for his native country at the Summer Olympics (2000 and 2008) in the men's super heavyweight division (+ 105 kg), finishing in 11th and 4th place in the final standings. In the 2003 world weightlifting championships in Vancouver he got the silver medal in the total, but it was later taken away because of doping use.

Udachyn was registered as the joint heaviest athlete at the London 2012 Olympics (alongside Carl Myerscough), weighing 160 kg.

External links

References

 iat.uni-leipzig.de
 

1980 births
Living people
Ukrainian male weightlifters
Olympic weightlifters of Ukraine
Weightlifters at the 2000 Summer Olympics
Weightlifters at the 2008 Summer Olympics
Sportspeople from Mariupol
World Weightlifting Championships medalists
European Weightlifting Championships medalists
20th-century Ukrainian people
21st-century Ukrainian people